Nicolas Achille Paroche (1 March 1868 – 27 May 1933) was a French sport shooter who competed in the 1900 Summer Olympics and 1920 Summer Olympics.

In 1900 at Paris and won a total of four Olympic medals. He won the gold medal in the military rifle (prone) competition, two silver medals in the military pistol individual and team events and a bronze medal with the French team in the military rifle team competition. He was also seventh in the individual military rifle, 3 positions event, 16th in the military rifle, kneeling event and 19th in the military rifle, standing event.

Twenty years later at Antwerp he won a silver medal in the Team 300 m military rifle (prone) event. He was also fourth in the team military rifle, 300 m + 600 m event, fifth in the individual 300 m military rifle, prone event, in the team 50 m small bore rifle event, in the team 300 m military rifle, standing event and in the team 600 m military rifle event and seventh in the team free rifle event. He also participated in the individual 300 m free rifle, 3 positions event, in the individual 300 m military rifle, standing event and in the individual 50 m small bore rifle event, but his placement in those competitions is unknown.

References

External links
 
profile

1868 births
1933 deaths
Sportspeople from Ardennes (department)
French male sport shooters
ISSF rifle shooters
ISSF pistol shooters
Olympic gold medalists for France
Olympic silver medalists for France
Olympic bronze medalists for France
Olympic shooters of France
Shooters at the 1900 Summer Olympics
Shooters at the 1920 Summer Olympics
Olympic medalists in shooting
Medalists at the 1900 Summer Olympics
Medalists at the 1920 Summer Olympics